Penn Township is a township in Westmoreland County, Pennsylvania, United States.

History

Penn Township, officially known as the Township of Penn, was named after Pennsylvania founder William Penn. The township was incorporated on February 23, 1855.

In the early years after its founding, numerous Scotch-Irish Americans came to the area to farm its rich land. Later in the township's history, coal mining contributed heavily to the economy.

Penn Township is also home to the Bushy Run Battlefield. The Bushy Run Battlefield was listed on the National Register of Historic Places in 1966, and is designated a National Historic Landmark.

In 1957 Carnegie Mellon University chose the township for a new lab facility.

Geography

Penn Township is located in the western part of Westmoreland County. It is approximately 25 miles east from Pittsburgh and seven miles west of Greensburg. The township is bordered by north by Murrysville, to the northeast by Salem Township, to the east by Hempfield Township, to the southeast by Jeannette, to the southwest by North Huntington Township, to the west-southwest by Trafford, and to the west by Monroeville.

Penn Township maintains nearly 100 miles of roadways. The township has three major transportation routes within its boundaries: Pennsylvania Route 130, Pennsylvania Route 993, and the Pennsylvania Turnpike.

According to the United States Census Bureau, the township has a total area of 30.76 square miles (79.1 km2), all 0 land.

Penn Township is also part of the Turtle Creek (Monongahela River tributary) watershed.

Government 

Penn Township was incorporated in 1855 and became a First Class township in 1958. The township is governed by five commissioners who are publicly elected and serve a four-year term. Penn Township also has a tax collector elected to serve a four-year term.

Like all First Class Townships, Penn Township has a fully functioning police force.

Demographics

Population 
As of July 1, 2021, Penn Township has a population of 20,346. This is a 1.5% increase from the 2020 US Census Population.

Age and Sex

Race

Education 

Penn Township is within the Penn-Trafford School District. The district operates eight schools, six of which are in Penn Township:

 McCullough Elementary School
 Level Green Elementary School
 Sunrise Estates Elementary School
 Harrison Park Elementary School
 Penn Middle School
 Penn-Trafford High School

The Murrysville branch of the Westmoreland County Community College is located along Mellon Road.

Penn Township has an overall graduation rate of 96.3% and a bachelor's degree rate of 37.7%

References

External links
 Penn Township - Official Website
 Penn-Trafford Star
 Penn Trafford News - Official Newspaper

Townships in Westmoreland County, Pennsylvania